Marie Clements (born January 10, 1962) is a Canadian Métis playwright, performer, director, producer and screenwriter. Marie was founding artistic director of urban ink productions, and is currently co-artistic director of red diva projects, and director of her new film company Working Pajama Lab Entertainment. Clements lives on Galiano Island, British Columbia. As a writer Marie has worked in a variety of mediums including theatre, performance, film, multi-media, radio, and television.

Early life
Clements was born in Vancouver, British Columbia. Early in her life she studied dance, speech, singing, piano, and music, but she dreamed of being a foreign correspondent. She studied journalism at Mount Royal College in Calgary, Alberta.

Career 
During the 1980s Clements worked as a radio news reporter and is still a freelance contributor to CBC radio. She has also worked in the writing department of the television series Da Vinci's Inquest  which featured a plot line similar to The Unnatural and Accidental Women which is based on the murders of several Indigenous women in Vancouver's Skid Row district.

She has been a playwright in residence at the National Theatre School of Canada, the Banff Centre for the Arts, the Firehall Arts Centre, and the National Arts Centre. She has been writer-in-residence at several prominent Canadian universities, including Simon Fraser University and University of British Columbia

Theatre Research in Canada (TRIC) dedicated a special issue of the journal to the celebration of Clements's contribution to Canadian theatre.

In 2010, Clements founded Working Pajama Lab, which specializes in the development, creation and strategic weaving of story across film, t.v., digital media and live performance. She also founded Red Diva Project the same year when she was commissioned to create the Aboriginal Pavilion's closing performance at the 2010 Winter Olympics in Vancouver, British Columbia, Canada.

Clements's plays often consider several overlapping themes, such as the themes of racism, sexism, and violence explored in The Unnatural and Accidental Women. Her theatrical style is a blending of Aboriginal storytelling, ritual and western theatrical conventions. As a playwright, director, and dramaturg, she "explores important issues of women, aboriginals, and the realities of the urban core in innovative, highly theatrical stagings"

It was while touring the Canadian north that Clements wrote her first play, Age of Iron (1993). She says it was "sheer cold boredom and a serious desire to understand and integrate the elemental connections between Greek mythology and Native thought" that inspired her to write the play.

Clements's plays often "reframe...authorized Western histories" to encourage spectators acknowledgement of alternative histories and critically engage with the process of historiography. Both Burning vision (staged by Tom Bentley-Fisher for The Barcelona International Grec Festival) and The Unnatural and Accidental Women engage with elements of Canadian history that are pushed to the periphery and press issues of "counter-hegemonic remembrance practices"

Her importance as a Canadian playwright is reflected in the number of award nominations, the multiple translations of her works, and the number of scholarly articles dedicated to her plays.

Awards
 2004 Awarded the Canada - Japan Literary Award – Burning Vision
 2004 Nomination for the George Ryga Literary Award - Burning Vision
 2004 Nomination for the Governor General's Literary Award for Drama - Burning Vision (finalist)
 2002 Nomination for Siminovitch Prize in Theatre – Outstanding contribution to Canadian Theatre
 2001 Nomination Jessie Richardson Theatre Award – Outstanding Original Play- Burning Vision
 1998 Jessie Richardson Theatre Award – The P.T.C. Award – Outstanding Original Play In Development – The Unnatural and Accidental Women
 1998 Sundance Screenwriting Competition – Finalist – Now look what you made me do
 1997 Praxis Screenwriting Competition – Shortlisted – Now look what you made me do
 1996 Minneapolis Playwright's Center – Fellowship Award – Now look what you made me do
 1994 Nomination Jessie Richardson Awards – Outstanding Ensemble Creation – Wet Dreams
 1994 Nomination Jessie Richardson Awards – Outstanding Ensemble Performance – Wet Dreams
 1994 Nomination Jessie Richardson Awards – Sydney Risk Award – Age of Iron
 1993 Nomination Jessie Richardson Awards – Outstanding Original Play – Age of Iron

Writings and appearances

Plays

Age of Iron (1993)
Now Look What You Made Me Do (1997)
The Girl Who Swam Forever (1997)
The Unnatural and Accidental Women (2000)
Burning Vision (2002)
Copper Thunderbird (2007)
The Edward Curtis Project : A Modern Picture Story(2010)
Tombs of the Vanishing Indian (2012)
Iron Peggy(2020)

Film
Unnatural & Accidental (2006), screenwriter
Unnatural and Accidental (2006), actor (Native Bartender)
Da Vinci's Inquest (2002), actor (Melanie Frum)
Making History: Louis Riel and the North-West Rebellion of 1885
The Road Forward (2017), writer/director
Red Snow (2019)
Bones of Crows (2022)
Lay Down Your Heart (2022)

Radio
 Tombs of the Vanishing Indian (in development)
 hours of water- radio drama - CBC Radio Drama 2005.
 Women in Fish Series - A four-part documentary, CBC Outfront 2005.
 The Meter is Running - Sounds Like Canada, CBC Radio 2003
 Vancouver Rose - ongoing CBC Radio Commentary 2002

Multi-Media

Missing (2017)
The Edward Curtis Project (2013)
The Red Diva Project (2008)
Hours of Water (2004)
The Women in Fish Interactive Installation
Urban Tattoo (1999)

References

Further reading

Farfan, Penny. "Historical Landscapes in Contemporary Plays by Canadian Women." Contemporary Women Playwrights: Into the 21st Century. Eds. Farfan, Penny, and Ferris, Lesley. New York: Palgrave Macmillan, 2014.
 Floriane Moro: Vanishing Indians, Missing Women, and Indigenous Presence in the Work of Marie Clements. Thesis Magistra artium, John F. Kennedy Institute for North American Studies, FU Berlin, Chair: Birte Wege, Berlin 2017

External links
 Marieclements.ca
 

1962 births
Métis writers
Canadian women dramatists and playwrights
Living people
Writers from Vancouver
20th-century Canadian dramatists and playwrights
21st-century Canadian dramatists and playwrights
20th-century Canadian women writers
21st-century Canadian women writers
First Nations dramatists and playwrights
First Nations women writers
Métis filmmakers
Canadian women film directors
Film directors from Vancouver
20th-century First Nations writers
21st-century First Nations writers
Canadian Métis people
Mount Royal University alumni